Driver: Vegas is a mobile phone game developed by Gameloft and Glu Mobile that occurs after the events of Driver 3. The game is non-canon and not a part of the main series.

Story 
The storyline of Driver: Vegas happens after the ending of Driver 3, with Tanner in the emergency room. His heart has been jumpstarted, and he decides to go after Jericho, the criminal he failed to kill in Driver 3. To do this, he must travel to Las Vegas, Nevada.

Gameplay 
There are some on-foot missions in Driver: Vegas, but most of the missions are driving based.

Reception

References

External links
 IGN review

2005 video games
Driver (video game series)
Mobile games
Video games about police officers
Video games developed in France
Video games set in the Las Vegas Valley
Glu Mobile games
Single-player video games
Gameloft games